The 1960 St. Louis Cardinals season was the team's 41st year with the National Football League (NFL) and the first in St. Louis, following their relocation from Chicago, where they had played the previous 40 seasons. The Cardinals went 6–5–1 during the first season in their new city, while playing their home schedule at Busch Stadium.

Offseason

NFL draft

Regular season

Schedule

Standings

Awards and records 
 Led NFL, fewest rushing yards allowed, 1,212 yards 
 Jerry Norton, NFL leader, punting 
 Jerry Horton, tied NFL record, most interceptions in one game, 4

Milestones 
 John David Crow, 200 yard rushing game, 203 yards, achieved on December 18

References

External links 
 1960 St. Louis Cardinals at Pro-Football-Reference.com

St. Louis
Arizona Cardinals seasons
St Louis Card